"Napalm Sticks to Kids" is a rhythmic and rhyming performance that has seen life as both a published song and an informal military cadence with roots in the Vietnam War during which napalm—an incendiary gel—saw extensive use.

Song

"Napalm Sticks to Kids" is a 1972 song about the Vietnam War by Covered Wagon Musicians, a musical ensemble of active-duty military personnel stationed at Mountain Home Air Force Base.

According to the band, United States Army and Air Force personnel assigned to the 1st Cavalry Division originally wrote the words to "Napalm Sticks to Kids" while stationed in South Vietnam.  Each person wrote a verse about actions in which they participated,  their collective bitterness toward the military that had turned them into murderers."  When one of those Vietnam veterans—Sergeant Mike Elliot—was assigned to Mountain Home AFB, he had the lyrics published in the first issue of the Helping Hand newsletter, from where it spread throughout the military world.

Cadence
Carol Burke, a professor at the United States Naval Academy (USNA) wrote about "Napalm Sticks to Kids" in the context of military cadences.  Since the mid-19th century, cadences have been for improving morale, unit cohesion, and the weight of military labor.  Burke observed that "offensiveness drives cadences", noting examples of insubordination, sexual objectification of women, and the celebration of collateral damage; General William Westmoreland explained these topics: "Gallows humor is, after all, merely a defense mechanism for men engaged in perilous and distasteful duties."

The "Napalm Sticks to Kids" cadence has been taught at training to all branches of the United States Armed Forces.  Its verses delight in the application of superior US technology that rarely if ever actually hits the enemy; "the [singer] fiendishly narrates in first person one brutal scene after another: barbecued babies, burned orphans, and decapitated peasants in an almost cartoonlike litany."  Burke also interpreted the call-and-response work song as a rebuke against anti-war protesters back home in an effort to self-transform the servicemember from the demonized "baby-killer" to the haunted and broken veteran.

"Napalm Sticks to Kids" was employed at the USNA from the early 1970s until the late 1980s when efforts were made to prohibit its singing.  During pre-production of the 1982 film An Officer and a Gentleman, the screenplay was sent to the US Navy for approval in the hopes that the military would support production of the film.  The Navy refused, citing as inaccurate: the film's vulgarity, offensive language, and amorality—including saying that "Napalm Sticks to Kids" was no longer used by the early 1980s.  Writer and producer Douglas Day Stewart knew otherwise; not only was he a former Naval officer, but during his research, an active Naval-officer trainer dictated "Napalm Sticks to Kids" to Stewart.  In response to the Navy's claims, Stewart traveled to Naval Air Station Pensacola and interviewed a group of officer candidates who all confirmed that the cadence was still in widespread use.  An Officer and a Gentleman did not modify the script to suit the Navy, and so without their support, the film features aviation candidates chanting the running song.

References

Further reading
 

1972 songs
American songs
military music
military traditions
songs about children
songs about death
songs of the Vietnam War